Marist Brothers High School is a Roman Catholic all-boys' high school situated in Suva, the capital of Fiji. It is a school in the Marist tradition, founded in 1946 by the order of Marist Brothers, which has had a presence in Fiji since 1844. The counterpart school for girls is St Joseph's Secondary School, Fiji . The school motto is In Hoc Signo Vinces.

History
Marist Brothers High School was founded and has been run by members of the Marist Brothers order since it opened to students in 1949. Founded by Saint Marcellin Champagnat, a Marist priest in France in 1816, the order went by the names of the Petits Frères de Marie (Little Brothers of Mary) and Fratres Maristae a Scolis (FMS or the Marist Brothers of the Schools, the post-nominal letters of the Marist Brothers). Marcellin's desire to have brothers to teach the rural children grew after his visit to the bedside of a sixteen-year-old, Jean Baptiste Montagne whom St. Marcellin discovered knew nothing of his faith.

Marist Brothers schools began in Australia in 1872 and in New Zealand in 1876. On 27 August 1888, three Marist brothers, Harvey, Vincent and Alphonsus, arrived in Suva to begin a school for the children of Catholic Europeans. This was in response to Bishop Vidal’s request to Brother Theophane, the Brother Superior General in France. On 7 September 1888, they began their school in a house, just above the Lilac Theatre in Waimanu Road. In 1889 they moved to Suva Street. At first only European boys were admitted but by 1897 Brothers Columba and Claudius had begun a school for Indian boys and other races, known as the Indian School or the Cosmopolitan School, on the corner of Suva Street and Toorak Road. By 1936 this had developed into St Columba’s School.

In 1912, Brothers Augustine, Alphonsus and Loyola began secondary classes in St Felix College, also on the Suva Street property. In 1936, after a considerable struggle with the civil authorities, who opposed secondary education for locally born children, the Brothers were allowed to reopen their secondary classes to all races. Thus the Marist Brothers High School had its beginnings in Suva Street. The High School was built at Bau Street during 1948, ready to begin the year there in 1949.

Extra-curricular activities

Marist sports

For the past four decades Marist Brothers High School has dominated athletics in Fiji. Athletics is a unifying force for the Marist community who come together every year to assist athletes for the annual Coca-Cola Games and later on in international meets.

Notable alumni

Architecture
 Ronald Fong Sang ONZM (1938-2021) Auckland Architect, art collector, art exhibitor and publisher of New Zealand Art books.

Law
 Devanesh Sharma – Lawyer, former President of the Fiji Law Society (2006–2007)
 Shannon Kumar - Lawyer, Kumar Goundar Lawyers

Literature & Music
 Daniel Rae Costello – Distinguished and accomplished Pacific musician, songwriter, composer, arranger, audio engineer, vocalist and producer.
 Arthur Philitoga – Accomplished Pacific musician, songwriter, composer, arranger, audio engineer, vocalist, entrepreneur and businessman
 Pranesh Prasad - Novelist and Huffington Post Columnist.

Military and police
 Jone Baledrokadroka – Former Fiji Military Acting Land Force Commander,
 Esala Teleni – Commissioner Police, Naval officer, former Fiji Rugby Captain,
 Pio Wong – SDL politician, served as Cabinet Minister in Qarase government (Head Boy 1960s),
 Ratu Tevita Uluilakeba Mara – Former 3FIR Commander.
 Ratu Meli Saubulinayau - Lt.Colonel, former Acting Land Force Commander (Head Boy 1970s)

Politics
Frank Bainimarama, Commander of the Republic of Fiji Military Forces (1998–2014); interim coup leader (2007–2014), Prime Minister of Fiji (2007–2009; 2009–2014; 2014–present)
Ratu Sir Kamisese Mara, Fiji's first Prime Minister, 1970; late President of Fiji, Turaga Na Tui Nayau, Sau ni vanua o Lau, Tui Lau
Hugh Ragg, Member of the Legislative Council and Executive Council
Feleti Sevele, former Prime Minister of Tonga
Harish Sharma, Former Deputy Prime Minister of Fiji.
Vijay R. Singh, Former Speaker of Parliament in Fiji.
William Yee, first Fijian-Chinese Member of Parliament
Aiyaz Sayed-Khaiyum, Distinguished lawyer and current Fijian Attorney General (2007–2014; 2014–present) and also the Minister for Economy, Civil Service and Communications, and also serves the Minister responsible for climate change 2018.
Kenneth Zinck - Minister for Labour 2001- 2006

Sports
 Ilivasi Tabua – Former Wallabies player and former Flying Fijians coach
 Marika Vunibaka – Former Flying Fijian and Canterbury Crusaders winger
 Netani Talei – Current Flying Fijians backrower
 Gabiriele Lovobalavu – Flying Fijians center
 Sunia Koto – Flying Fijians hooker
 Dominiko Waqaniburotu – Flying Fijians utility forward,
 Leslie Copeland – Javelin record holder in Fiji
 Lote Tuqiri – Former Rugby Union winger for the Waratahs and Wallabies & former Rugby League wing/center for the Fiji Bati and South Sydney Rabbitohs
 Lote Tuqiri (Junior) – Winger for Japan Seven's
 Banuve Tabakaucoro – Pacific Sprint-King and 200m sprint Pacific Games record holder
 Viliame Kikau – Front row for the Fiji Bati and second row for Penrith Panthers NRL
 Asaeli Tikoirotuma – Former Flying Fijian and Waikato Chiefs winger
 Benito Masilevu – Former Fiji Seven's playmaker, currently the Flying Fijians winger
 Naulia Dawai – Flying Fijians loose forward
 Manasa Mataele – Predominantly plays as a winger for the Canterbury Crusaders. He is also the nephew of Crusaders center Seta Tamanivalu
 Jale Vatubua – Flying Fijians inside centre and plays for Pou in France
 Eneriko Buliruarua – Flying Fijians outside centre and plays for Brive in France
 Christohpher Minimbi – Flying Fijians and FIjian Drua lock 
 Kaliopasi Uluilakepa – Fijian Drua Prop/former NZ under 20 prop
 Samuela Tawake – Flying Fijians and Fijian Drua prop

References

Buildings and structures in Suva
Educational institutions established in 1949
1949 establishments in Fiji
Catholic schools in Fiji
Fiji
Schools in Fiji